Philip Ian Bedford (11 February 1930 – 18 September 1966) was an English first-class cricketer who had a sensational start to his first-class career with Middlesex in 1947 as a 17-year-old lower-order batsman and leg break bowler. In his first match, against Essex, he was the fourth spin bowler used in the Essex first innings, but took four wickets for 81 runs. He then took four for 65 in his second match against Nottinghamshire, five for 53 in his third against Surrey and five for 54 in his fourth and final match of 1947 against Lancashire.

He was less successful in subsequent seasons, and returned to club cricket in 1951 while working for a construction company, until he succeeded John Warr as Middlesex captain in 1961 and 1962. He was a popular captain, who often declared boldly in an effort to achieve a result.

Bedford played in 77 first-class matches between 1947 and 1962, taking 128 wickets at an average cost of 32.87, with a personal best of 6/52.

He died following a brain aneurysm, while batting for Finchley C.C. at Buckhurst Hill in 1966. He was 36. He left a wife and four young daughters.

References

External links
 
 

1930 births
1966 deaths
English cricketers
Middlesex cricket captains
Combined Services cricketers
Marylebone Cricket Club cricketers
North v South cricketers
Gentlemen of England cricketers
Cricketers from Greater London
Deaths from aneurysm
Middlesex cricketers